Heinz Schöch (born 20 August 1940) is a German Law professor and Criminologist.   He is emeritus professor for Criminal law, Criminology, Youth law and sentencing at Munich University.

Life
Schöch was born in Bessarabia where his family were part of the ethnic German community.   The region had been incorporated into the Soviet Union in June 1940, a couple of months before his birth, as part of the territorial carve-up envisaged in the non-aggression pact concluded between Hitler and Stalin the previous summer.   Following the ethnic cleansing of the early 1940s he ended up in the US occupation zone of postwar Germany.   In 1959 Schöch successfully concluded his schooling in Bad Cannstatt (Stuttgart).  He moved on to undertake a General Studies course at Leibniz College in Tübingen.   This was followed by work for his law degree at Tübingen and Hamburg.   Between 1965 he worked as a research assistant and lecturer at Tübingen's Criminology Institute, passing Part 1 of the state law exams in 1965 and Part 2 in 1969.   He received his doctorate for basic work on sentencing practice and traffic offences ("Strafzumessungspraxis und Verkehrsdelinquenz") in 1972.

Between 1974 and 1994 he held a full professorship in Sentencing and Criminology at Göttingen, also serving as a temporary judge at the city's district court.   In 1985/86 he served as dean of the Law Faculty.   During his two decades at Göttingen he turned down offers of university posts at Bielefeld (1977) and Zürich (1981).   In 1994 he accepted an appointment at Munich, however, where he succeeded Horst Schüler-Springorum As full professor for  Criminology, Youth Justice and Sentencing.   Between 1996 and 1998 he was sub-dean of the Jurisprudence faculty and a member of the university senate.   Between 2001 and 2003 he was Dean of the Jurisprudence faculty and headed up the newly established "Jurisprudence Seminars" department.   Heinz Schöch retired from the Munich professorial post on 1 October 2008.

In 1979 he was a founder member of the Lower Saxony Criminology Research Institute.    Between 1994 and 2006 Schöch was a member of the German Jurists' Cpuncil, and between 2001 and 2003 he was president of the Criminology Association.   From 2008 he chaired the advisory board of the Max Planck Institute for Foreign and International Criminal Law, based in Freiburg, having been since 1994 a board member of the victims' support organisation, Weißer Ring.

Between 2011 and 2015 he was a member of the long-standing "Evaluierungskommission Freiburger Sportmedizin" established to uncover the truth behind allegations of sports-doping.   In his letter of resignation from the commission, which was published, he was critical of the commission chairman Letizia Paoli.

References

20th-century jurists
21st-century jurists
German criminologists
Academic staff of the Ludwig Maximilian University of Munich
Officers Crosses of the Order of Merit of the Federal Republic of Germany
1940 births
Living people
People from Sarata